The 1994–95 season was Colchester United's 53rd season in their history and their third consecutive season in the fourth tier of English football, the Third Division. Alongside competing in the Third Division, the club also participated in the FA Cup, the League Cup and the Football League Trophy.

George Burley was installed as Roy McDonough's replacement following his sacking at the end of last season. Following a poor start to the season, Burley turned around Colchester's fortunes as the U's lost just once in 20 league and cup matches. However, he left the club on 24 December to join local rivals Ipswich Town. Dale Roberts was placed in charge as caretaker manager before former Colchester defender Steve Wignall was appointed. He led the club to a 10th-place finish in the league.

Colchester reached the third round of the FA Cup, where they faced Premier League opposition in Wimbledon. They lost that game 1–0 at Selhurst Park. Meanwhile, the U's were eliminated from the Football League Trophy in the group stages, while Brentford won over two legs in the League Cup.

Season overview
With chairman Gordon Parker sacking former manager and his own son-in-law Roy McDonough just days after the conclusion of the 1993–94 season, former Ayr United player-manager George Burley was appointed his replacement in July. Burley had a shaky start, with a number of youth team players called up for the first game of the season due to injuries. With coach Dale Roberts his assistant, Burley brought in new players, and following six straight defeats from the beginning of the season, the management team turned results around with just one defeat in 20 league and cup matches.

Unbeknownst to Colchester United supporters for their Boxing Day clash with Northampton Town at Layer Road, Burley had in fact resigned after local rivals Ipswich Town had been refused permission to speak with him regarding their vacant managers position. He left the club in fifth place in the table, but one that soured relations with the Suffolk club. Dale Roberts was appointed caretaker manager. He led the U's out at Selhurst Park to face Wimbledon in the third round of the FA Cup, the first time that Colchester would face Premier League opposition. The hosts won 1–0, with half of the 6,903 crowd at Selhurst Park Colchester United supporters. Days later, former Colchester defender Steve Wignall was appointed as Burley's replacement.

On 4 March, Colchester allowed free admittance to all attending the clash with Darlington, including away supporters. Colchester won the game 1–0 in front of a bumper 6,055 crowd.

In the latter stages of the campaign, the U's looked well placed to claim a play-off position, but with just two points earned from the last four games of the season, Colchester eventually finished 10th, twelve points adrift of the play-off spots.

Players

Transfers

In

 Total spending:  ~ £30,000

Out

 Total incoming:  ~ £30,000

Loans in

Match details

Third Division

Results round by round

League table

Matches

League Cup

Football League Trophy

FA Cup

Squad statistics

Appearances and goals

|-
!colspan="14"|Players who appeared for Colchester who left during the season

|}

Goalscorers

Disciplinary record

Clean sheets
Number of games goalkeepers kept a clean sheet.

Player debuts
Players making their first-team Colchester United debut in a fully competitive match.

See also
List of Colchester United F.C. seasons

References

General
Books

Websites

Specific

1994-95
English football clubs 1994–95 season
1994–95 Football League Third Division by team